Jaime Castillo may refer to:

Jaime Castillo Velasco (1914–2003), Chilean politician, Minister of Justice
Jaime Castillo (Canada), Canadian politician

See also 
 Jaime